"Halloween Addiction" is a Halloween EP released by Tomoko Kawase under the Tommy heavenly6 persona, and features one track performed by Tommy february6. It contains two previously released "Halloween singles" and one new track. It was released October 17, 2012. Halloween Addiction debuted at #10 on the Oricon chart.

Track listing
All songs written by Tomoko Kawase and Shunsaku Okuda, all songs performed by Tommy heavenly6 except "Why Don't You Come with Me?" performed by Tommy february6.

CD

DVD

References

2012 EPs
Japanese-language EPs